Guhiya River is a small river in Pali District of Rajasthan, India.  It is an intermittent stream running only during the monsoon season and is a tributary of the Luni River.

It rises in the foothills of the Aravalli Range near the villages of Khariya Neev (Khariyaniv) and Tharasani in Sojot Tehsil. Its tributaries include the Radia Nadi, Guria Nadi, Lilri Nadi, Sukri (stream) and Phunpharia.

References

External links
  

Rivers of Rajasthan
Rivers of India